is a railway station in Nagata Town, Isahaya, Nagasaki Prefecture, Japan. It is operated by JR Kyushu and is on the Nagasaki Main Line.

Lines

Station layout 
The station, which is unstaffed, consists of two side platforms serving two tracks. There is no station building. Near the entrance to station is a shelter which houses an automatic ticket vending machine. Shelters are also provided on the platforms for passengers. Access to the opposite side platform is by means of a footbridge.

Adjacent stations

History
Japanese Government Railways (JGR) built the station in the 1930s during the development of an alternative route for the Nagasaki Main Line along the coast of the Ariake Sea. Hizen-Nagata was opened on the same day as an intermediate station on this stretch of track. With through traffic achieved from Hizen-Yamaguchi on the new route to Nagasaki, the entire stretch of track was designated as part of the Nagasaki Main Line on 1 December 1934. With the privatization of Japanese National Railways (JNR), the successor of JGR, on 1 April 1987, control of the station passed to JR Kyushu.

Passenger statistics
In fiscal 2014, there were a total of 49,229 boarding passengers, given a daily average of 135 passengers.

Station environs
Nagasaki Ken'ei Bus, Higashi Nagata Bus Stop
Nagata Post Office
National Isahaya Youth Outdoor Learning Center (though this is the closest station, there is a direct bus from Isahaya Station)
National Route 207
Ōsato-Moriyama-Hizennagata Prefectural Route 124

See also
 List of railway stations in Japan

References

External links
Hizen-Nagata Station (JR Kyushu)

Nagasaki Main Line
Railway stations in Nagasaki Prefecture
Railway stations in Japan opened in 1934